The Neotropical fruit bats (Artibeus) are a genus of bats within the subfamily Stenodermatinae. The genus consists of 12 species, which are native to Central and South America, as well as parts of the Caribbean.

Description
These bats grow to an average length of 5 to 10 cm, and a weight of 10 to 85 g. The fur is colored brown or gray on the top; the bottom side is brighter. In a few species, the faces have four light-colored stripes. The patagium, the skin between the legs, is very small, and they lack a tail – a general characteristic of the fruit bats. The ears are acuminated and like many other leaf-nosed bats the nose bears a small, sharp leaf which is used for echolocation.

Geographical distribution and habitat
Neotropical fruit bats are found in an area that reaches from the north of Mexico and the Bahamas, to northern Argentina, the Caribbean islands included. They live in different natural habitats and can be found in both forests and grasslands.

Diet, reproduction and social behaviour
Like most bats, Neotropical fruit bats are nocturnal.  They sleep in caves, houses, or other hideouts. Some species use large leaves to form "tents", which provide shelter from the weather and hide them from predators.  Most species live in large groups. Artibeus jamaicensis – the best studied species – forms groups, consisting of one to three males, three to 14 females, and the shared offspring.

The diet of these bats mainly consists of fruit, but they eat pollen and insects too.

Little is known about the reproduction of many species. A. jamaicensis has a gestation period of usually 112 to 120 days that can be extended up to 180 days due to dormancy. The offspring usually consists of one young, which is weaned after two months and becomes sexually mature at an age of eight to twelve months. Captured bats can live up to ten years.

Taxonomy
The genus of the Neotropical fruit bats is divided into two sub-genera (Artibeus and Koopmania).

Genus Artibeus - Neotropical fruit bats
Subgenus Artibeus
Large fruit-eating bat, Artibeus amplus lives in Colombia, Venezuela, and Guyana.
Fringed fruit-eating bat, Artibeus fimbriatus has its habitat in southern Brazil, in Paraguay and in the North of Argentina.
Fraternal fruit-eating bat, Artibeus fraterculus is only known in Ecuador and Peru.
Hairy fruit-eating bat, Artibeus hirsutus lives in western Mexico.
Honduran fruit-eating bat, Artibeus inopinatus is located in Middle America (El Salvador, Nicaragua, and Honduras). This poorly known species is considered data deficient by the IUCN.
Jamaican fruit bat, Artibeus jamaicensis is the best explored species. It is spread from the Bahamas and northern Mexico, through Central America to northwestern Peru. Populations east of the Andes in South America are now usually regarded a separate species, A. planirostris.
Great fruit-eating bat, Artibeus lituratus is spread from southern Mexico to northern Argentina.
Dark fruit-eating bat, Artibeus obscurus lives exclusively in the Amazon Basin.
Flat-faced fruit-eating bat, Artibeus planirostris is found in most of tropical South America east of the Andes. Often considered a subspecies of A. jamaicensis
 Subgenus Koopmania
Brown fruit-eating bat, Artibeus concolor lives in the Amazon Basin.

Extinct Species
Anthony's fruit-eating bat, Artibeus anthonyi - Quaternary of Cuba

References

 Ronald M. Nowak: Walker's Mammals of the World. The Johns Hopkins University Press, Baltimore 1999, .

External links
 Jorge Ortega, Iván Castro-Arellano (2001): Artibeus jamaicensis. Mammalian Species No. 662, American Society of Mammalogists.

 
Bats of Central America
Bats of South America
Bats of the Caribbean
Bat genera
Taxa named by William Elford Leach